Lillie or Lilie may refer to:

 Lillie (name)
 Lillie (TV series), 1978 British television serial
 Lillie, Louisiana, village in the United States
 Lillie (film), 1999 film starring Loretta Devine
 Lilie (poem), in Kytice, anthology by Karel Jaromír Erben
 Lillie Glacier, glacier of Antarctica
 Lillie Range, mountain range of Antarctica
 Lillie Bridge Grounds, a sports ground in London
 Lillie a Pokémon character
 Lillie (pilot boat), pilot boat renamed the Richard K. Fox

See also
 Lili (disambiguation)
 Lille (disambiguation)
 Lilley (disambiguation)
 Lilli (disambiguation)
 Lillie Langtry (horse), Irish Thoroughbred racehorse
 Lilly (disambiguation)
 Lily (disambiguation)